Vomito Negro is a Belgian electronic band formed in 1983. The name is Spanish and Portuguese for "black vomit", a phenomenon that arises in the last stage of the disease yellow fever.

History
After numerous successful releases like Shock, Human and The New Drug, and discontent with the result of their last studio album Fireball, Gin Devo decided to put Vomito Negro aside for a while and to invest all his energy and creativity in his new project called Pressure Control and released the debut album Vamp. After only two more concerts Guy Van Mieghem sold his studio equipment and stopped all musical activities. In 2008 Gin decided to bring back Vomito Negro. After asking BORG, who already was a member of Gin Devo's side project Pressure Control, to join the band. While they successfully toured Europe from 2008 until 2009, the duo started working on the new album.

On January 22, 2010, the band released Skull & Bones through Out of Line Records. Some of these new tracks like "Black Tie, White Shirt" and "Darkmoon" were already tested on the crowd of the WGT Festival, in Leipzig and the Bimfest in Antwerp.

In February 2010, just after its release, Skull & Bones entered the German Alternative Charts (DAC) on the tenth position, only to climb further up to the second position one week later. Meanwhile, the remake version of their club classic "Move Your Body (V2K10)", which is featured on the bonus disc of the limited edition version, entered the DAC's single charts and reaching 13th place.

In January 2013, the band released the album Fall of an Empire.

Discography
M.A.C.S.
Vomito Negro (1985)
Dare (1987)
Stay Alive (1987)
Musical Art Conjunct of Sound (1989)
Shock (1989)
Human (1990)
Save the World (1990)
The New Drug (1991)
Compiled (1992)
Wake Up (1992)
Musical Art Conjunct of Sound (2000)
Fireball (2002)
Skull & Bones (2010)
Slave Nation(EP) (2011)
Fall of an Empire (2013)
Death Sun (2014)
Black Plague (2017)

References

External links

 

Belgian electronic music groups
Electronic body music groups
Musical groups established in 1983
Belgian industrial music groups
Metropolis Records artists